The  was a railway line in northern Japan that linked Aomori Station in Aomori Prefecture and Hakodate Station in Hokkaido.

The Tsugaru-Kaikyō Line was actually made up of portions of four separate lines: the Tsugaru Line, operated by East Japan Railway Company, and the Kaikyō, Esashi, and Hakodate Main lines, operated by Hokkaido Railway Company. The name was created following the opening of the Kaikyō Line and Seikan Tunnel on 13 March 1988.

The line name has been out of use since 26 March 2016 when the Hokkaido Shinkansen opened and replaced the regular passenger services connecting Aomori and Hakodate on the Tsugaru-Kaikyō Line with high-speed services along the shinkansen line. The railway lines that formed the Tsugaru-Kaikyō Line continue to operate freight and passenger trains except for passenger trains on the Kaikyō Line section. The section of line between Naka-Oguni and Kikonai Station ceased operation for conventional line passenger trains like Hakuchō and Super Hakuchō and sleeper trains like Hokutosei, Cassiopeia, Twilight Express and Hamanasu by the 21 March 2015. Today this section is only operated by the Hokkaido Shinkansen and conventional line freight trains.

Station and line divisions
 Aomori Station through Naka-Oguni Station comprised part of the Tsugaru Line
 Between Naka-Oguni Station and Kikonai Station was the Kaikyō Line with former stations
 Kikonai Station through Goryōkaku Station comprised part of the Esashi Line (present-day South Hokkaido Railway)
 Goryōkaku Station through Hakodate Station comprised part of the Hakodate Main Line

References

External links

 
Lines of East Japan Railway Company
Rail transport in Aomori Prefecture
1067 mm gauge railways in Japan